Gronowski (feminine Gronowska) is a Polish surname. Notable people include:
 Henryk Gronowski (1928-1977), Polish footballer
 Janusz Gronowski (born 1935), Polish athlete
 Robert Gronowski (1926-1994), Polish footballer
 Simon Gronowski (born 1931), Belgian Jewish pianist
 Tadeusz Gronowski (1894-1990), Polish artist

Polish-language surnames